The 17th Infantry Division "Pavia" was an infantry division of the Royal Italian Army during World War II. The Pavia was formed in on 27 April 1939 and named after the city of Pavia. The Pavia was classified as an auto-transportable division, meaning it had some motorized transport, but not enough to move the entire division at once. The Pavia had its recruiting area and regimental depots in the Romagna and its headquarters in Ravenna. Its two infantry regiments were based in Cesena (27th) and Ravenna (28th), with the division's artillery regiment based in Ravenna. Shortly after its formation the division was sent to Sabratha in Italian Libya. It participated in the Western Desert campaign and was destroyed during the Second Battle of El Alamein.

History 
After the Second Italian War of Independence the Austrian Empire had to cede the Lombardy region of the Kingdom of Lombardy–Venetia to the Kingdom of Sardinia. After taking control of the region the government of Sardinia ordered the Royal Sardinian Army on 29 August 1859 to raise five infantry brigades and one grenadier brigade in Lombardy. Subsequently on 1 March 1860 the Brigade "Pavia" was activated with the newly raised 27th and 28th infantry regiments.

World War I 
The brigade fought on the Italian front in World War I. On 20 October 1926 the brigade assumed the name of XVII Infantry Brigade with the 11th Infantry Regiment "Casale", 27th Infantry Regiment "Pavia", and 28th Infantry Regiment "Pavia". The brigade was the infantry component of the 17th Territorial Division of Ravenna, which also included the 26th Artillery Regiment. In 1934 the division changed its name to 27th Infantry Division "Rubicone". On 27 April 1939 the division transferred the 11th Infantry Regiment to the newly activated 56th Infantry Division "Casale" and on the same date the XVII Infantry Brigade was dissolved with its two remaining regiments coming under direct command of the division, which changed its name to 27th Infantry Division "Pavia".

World War II

From Tunisia to Tobruk 
After the outbreak of World War II the Pavia was sent to Libya, where it was garrisoned in Sabratha west of Tripoli. During the Italian invasion of France from 10–25 June 1940 the Pavia was deployed along the French Tunisian-Libyan border. After the signing of the Franco-Italian Armistice signed on 24 June 1940 the Pavia returned to its garrison in Gharyan near Tripoli and took up coastal defense duties in the Sabratha–Sorman area.

The Pavia did not participate in the invasion of Egypt in September 1940 and remained in Tripolitania. When the British Operation Compass destroyed the Italian 10th Army in Egypt the Italians sent reinforcements to eastern Libya, including the Pavia's 26th Artillery Regiment. The regiment was destroyed in the Battle of Beda Fomm on 6–7 February 1941 and was quickly reformed by transferring the motorized artillery groups of the 2nd Cavalry Division "Emanuele Filiberto Testa di Ferro" and 3rd Cavalry Division "Principe Amedeo Duca d'Aosta" to Libya.

In March 1941 the Pavia moved to Benghazi for the Axis Operation Sonnenblume offensive of March–April 1941. Under Major-General Pietro Zaglio it attacked on 31 March 1941 via the Via Balbia road from Ajdabiya, driving the Australian rearguards back to Mechili, which by 6 April was surrounded. Two Bersaglieri battalions came up in support, along with the advance elements of the German 5th Light Division. On 8 April General Michael Gambier-Parry surrendered to Axis forces. In the aftermath of the counter-attack, elements of the Pavia were transferred to Sirte to defend an airfield near . Meanwhile the bulk of Axis forces continued the advance reaching Derna and Martuba by 22 May 1941. In June, the Pavia returned to the front to participate in the Siege of Tobruk and was engaged repeatedly in intense probing attacks carried out by the 9th Australian Division.

Operation Crusader 
On 23 November 1941 the British 70th Infantry Division, supported by 60 tanks broke through the line of the nearby 25th Infantry Division "Bologna". The Pavia helped to contain the breakthrough. On 27 November, the 19th New Zealand Battalion leading the 6th New Zealand Brigade, finally linked up with the British 70th Infantry Division at El Duda., weakening the position of the Pavia. Further British attacks were launched on the positions of the Pavia from 3 to 4 December 1941. On 4 December, Rommel ordered a withdrawal to the Gazala Line, which entailed giving up Tobruk. During the withdrawal, the Pavia served as a rearguard at El Adem where it managed a brief but competent defense. The rearguard action continued from 7 until 16 December 1941. The Pavia's rearguard was annihilated on 14 December 1941, when the 22nd New Zealand Battalion encountering weak resistance, apart from two brief counterattacks, and under the cover of darkness took the rearguard's position and 382 Italian prisoners at a cost of 3 killed and 27 wounded. On 15 December, the bulk of the Pavia fought on the Gazala Line against the 2nd New Zealand Division and Polish Carpathian Rifle Brigade, managing to hold its line after a poor initial beginning (with the loss of some hundreds of prisoners), allowing a strong German armored force to counter-attack and overrun the 1st Battalion, The Buffs, (Royal East Kent Regiment).

From this point on the retreat of the Axis forces quickened. On 17 December 1941 the Pavia fought at Timimi 70 km west of Tobruk, then on the Mechili–Derna, Libya line. At this point, the British advance was halted due to logistic problems following the rapid advance, giving the Axis forces a quiet time.

From Libya to Egypt 
The Pavia started to advance gradually from late January 1942, returning to its initial positions of 1941 west of Tobruk on 26 May 1942. On 28–29 May 1942, the Pavia helped to encircle residual British forces at Tobruk and Gazala. During the Battle of Gazala, the Pavia was used to mop up British units, taking charge of 6,000 Allied prisoners by 16 June 1942. On 27 June 1942, the division reached Bardia and continued to advance to Sollum and ultimately Sidi Barrani. On 1 July 1942 the Pavia division reached Dayr al Abyaḑ, south of El Alamein. The Pavia fought in the First battle of El Alamein as part of the X Army Corps. During the initial phase of the fighting the Pavia served as rearguard for the 132nd Armored Division "Ariete", where it had an isolated, limited defensive success. A few elements of the Pavia along with the 27th Infantry Division "Brescia" put up a stubborn defense on Ruweisat Ridge on the night of 14–15 July, allowing a German armored force to arrive in time the next day to deliver a counterattack against the attacking New Zealand infantry and British armor. Captain Amalio Stagni and Corporal Ugo Vaia of the Pavia were both awarded a Silver Medal of Military Valour for their leadership during the action on Ruweisat Ridge. The Axis' advance then stalled until 30 August 1942 and attempts to advance were hampered by the Italian units' dwindling supplies and by stiffened British resistance.

During the Second Battle of El Alamein, one battalion of the Pavia fought alongside the 185th Paratroopers Division "Folgore". The battalion commenced to attack on 24 October 1942, on Qārat al Ḩumaymāt, taking over Naqb al Ralah over the steep El Diffa plateau edge, but failed to hold the majority of the plateau after Allied counterattacks. The British attacks intensified and on 3 November 1942 the Pavia was ordered to retreat from the plateau to the Qattara Depression. At the end of the battle, the Pavia and the other two divisions of X Army Corps were abandoned without transport (mostly useless anyway because of the harsh landscape on the division retreat route) by the rest of the retreating Axis forces on their way to Fūkah and Mersa Matruh on 4 November 1942. The Pavia tried to follow suit, but lost its rearguard at Deir el Nuss to Allied armored units. As a result the Pavia suffered heavy losses while on the march to the Fūkah. At Mersa Matruh, where several of the survivors of the Pavia had regrouped, including its commander, the remnants of the division had no option but to surrender on 7 November 1942. The Pavia division was officially dissolved 25 November 1942.

Organization 

  17th Infantry Division "Pavia", in Ravenna
 27th Infantry Regiment "Pavia", in Cesena
 Command Company
 3x Fusilier battalions
 Support Weapons Company (65/17 infantry support guns)
 Mortar Company (81mm Mod. 35 mortars)
 28th Infantry Regiment "Pavia", in Ravenna
 Command Company
 3x Fusilier battalions
 Support Weapons Company (65/17 infantry support guns)
 Mortar Company (81mm Mod. 35 mortars)
 26th Artillery Regiment "Pavia", in Ravenna
 Command Unit
 I Group (100/17 howitzers)
 II Group (100/17 howitzers; raised in 1942)
 III Group (75/27 field guns)
 IV Group (75/27 field guns)
 77th Anti-aircraft Battery (20/65 Mod. 35 anti-aircraft guns)
 432nd Anti-aircraft Battery (20/65 Mod. 35 anti-aircraft guns)
 Ammunition and Supply Unit
 LXIX Machine Gun Battalion
 XVII Replacements Battalion
 XVII Mixed Engineer Battalion
 17th Telegraph and Radio Operators Company
 1x Engineer Company
 1x Searchlight Section
 34th Anti-tank Company (47/32 anti-tank guns)
 21st Medical Section
 66th Field Hospital
 84th Field Hospital
 1x Surgical Unit
 Supply Section
 207th Transport Section
 679th Carabinieri Section
 71st Bakers Section
 54th Field Post Office

The following units were attached to the division during the Western Desert Campaign:
 V Tank Battalion "L"
 II Group/ 24th Artillery Regiment "Piemonte" (75/27 field guns)
 XLII Artillery Group (105/28 howitzers)

Commanding officers 
The division's commanding officers were:

 Generale di Brigata Pietro Zaglio (24 May 1939 - 20 April 1941)
 Generale di Brigata Umberto Marchesi (acting, 21 April 1941 - 17 May 1941)
 Generale di Brigata Antonio Franceschini (18 May 1941 - 23 March 1942)
 Generale di Brigata Dino Parri (acting, 24 March 1942 - 8 April 1942)
 Generale di Brigata Arturo Torriano (9 April 1942 - 20 September 1942)
 Generale di Brigata Nazzareno Scattaglia (21 September 1942 - 7 November 1942, POW)

References 

 
 

Infantry divisions of Italy in World War II
Infantry divisions of Italy
Military units and formations established in 1939
Military units and formations disestablished in 1942